Canusa may refer to:

 CANUSA Games
 Canusa Street